Han Peng (born 20 December 1989) is a Chinese footballer who plays as a midfielder for the China women's national football team.

International career
Han Peng made her debut for the Chinese women's national team on 15 February 2012 against Mexico. At the 2014 Torneio Internacional de Brasília de Futebol Feminino, Han Peng scored a "tremendous strike" in China's 1–1 draw with the United States.

International goals

References

External links
 
 

1989 births
Living people
Chinese women's footballers
China women's international footballers
2015 FIFA Women's World Cup players
Women's association football midfielders
Footballers from Tianjin
Footballers at the 2014 Asian Games
Footballers at the 2018 Asian Games
Asian Games silver medalists for China
Asian Games medalists in football
Medalists at the 2018 Asian Games
2019 FIFA Women's World Cup players